WKFR-FM (103.3 MHz), also known as KFR, is a Top 40 (CHR) outlet serving the Kalamazoo, Michigan radio market. It broadcasts with an ERP of 50 kW in Battle Creek, Michigan and is owned by Townsquare Media.

History

The station began operations in June 1963 as WELL-FM at 96.5 MHz, duplicating the programming of then-sister WELL/1400 (now WBFN). In 1964 WELL-AM-FM became WKFR-AM-FM; the AM station became Top 40 rocker "Keener 14" while the FM station, which also moved to 103.3 Megahertz, programmed Beautiful Music.  In 1972 WKFR changed its calls to WKNR after those calls were dropped by the former WKNR in Detroit, but the FM station remained WKFR-FM.  By the end of the 1970s, WKFR-FM had evolved from "good music" to an adult contemporary format.  In 1981 WKFR finally inherited the Top 40 format from WKNR and has had it ever since.

On August 30, 2013, a deal was announced in which Townsquare Media would acquire 53 Cumulus Media stations, including WKFR-FM, for $238 million. The deal was part of Cumulus' acquisition of Dial Global; Townsquare and Dial Global are both controlled by Oaktree Capital Management. The sale was consummated effective November 14, 2013.

Current Schedule Lineup

Mornings 5:30- 10 a.m.: Dana Marshall

Mid-days 10 a.m.-2 p.m.: Mark Frankhouse

Afternoons 2 p.m.-7 p.m.: Dave Benson

Nights 7 p.m.- Midnight: Pop Crush Nights with Kayla Thomas

Weekends: Marc Andrews / Backtrax USA with Kid Kelly / The Daly Download with Carson Daly

References

Michiguide.com - WKFR-FM History

External links
WKFR official website

KFR-FM
Radio stations established in 1963
Contemporary hit radio stations in the United States
1963 establishments in Michigan
Townsquare Media radio stations